Chak 63/RB Nihaloana Sahmal (چک 63 رب نہالوآنا ساہمل) (also known as Nihaluana or Nihalwana) is a village in Faisalabad district, Jaranwala Tehsil, Panjab, Pakistan.

References

Villages in Faisalabad District